Desert Rats is a 1945 play by the British writer Colin Morris. It revolves around a patrol of the British Eighth Army operating in the desert outside Tripoli during the North African Campaign.

It premiered at the Theatre Royal, Brighton before transferring to the Adelphi Theatre in London's West End where it ran for 44 performances between 26 April to 2 June 1945. The original West End cast included Richard Greene, Bill Owen, Kieron Moore, Ian Colin, Larry Noble, Manning Whiley and Michael Whittaker.

References

Bibliography
 Wearing, J.P. The London Stage 1940-1949: A Calendar of Productions, Performers, and Personnel.  Rowman & Littlefield,  2014.

1945 plays
West End plays
Plays about World War II
Plays set in Libya
Plays by Colin Morris